The AN/APS-4, originally known as ASH (air-surface, model H) is an early military air to air and air to surface radar used by American and British warplanes during World War II.

APS-4 operated in the X band at 3 cm, compared to the 10 cm S band used by most radars of the era. This allowed the antenna to be greatly reduced in size and the unit as a whole to fit into a single streamlined fairing that could be mounted to many aircraft.

In American service it was used on many aircraft, including the Douglas C-47 Skytrain, North American P-82D/F/H Twin Mustang, Vought F4U-2\5N Corsair,  Grumman F6F-3/5 Hellcat, Curtiss SB2C-5 Helldiver and Grumman TBF-3 and TBM-3S Avenger.

In Fleet Air Arm and RAF service it was known as ASV Mark IX and equipped a number of aircraft including the Fairey Firefly, Fairey Barracuda, de Havilland Mosquito and a small number of Grumman Avengers.

Design 

Physically, the APS-4 consists of a control box, one or two indicators, the same number of indicator-amplifiers, an antenna, a transmitter-receiver, and a cable junction box. The antenna and transmitter-receiver were typically housed externally below one wing, in a fiberglass shape that was similar to a Mk 17  bomb. These displays could be set for ranges of 4, 20, 50, and 100 nautical miles (6, 30, 80, and 160 km).

The APS-4 broadcast in the X-band with a wavelength of 3 cm. Peak broadcast power varied from 40 to 70 kW according to radar version.  Pulse repetition frequency was adjustable by the operator to either 600 or 1000 pulses per second.

The APS-4 emitted a radio beam in the form of a 6° cone.  The beam could be directed in three modes, manual, search and intercept. In manual mode the beam was aimed by operator control from 10° above, to 30° below the longitudinal axis of the aircraft. In search mode, the radar beam scans through 150° in azimuth, and while doing so would run two lines scans, each separated by 4°.  This caused the beam to cover 10° in a vertical plane. In intercept mode, the beam executes a four-line scan, with 6° between lines, to cover a vertical plane of 24°. Results were displayed on one or two 3-inch displays.

An improved version was called the AN/APS-5. A simplified version for single-seat fighters was called the APS-6.

References 

World War II radars
Aircraft radars
World War II Allied electronics
X band radar